Most Gracious Majesty is a form of address in the United Kingdom. It is an elaborate version of Your Majesty and is only used in the most formal of occasions.

Historical background
Around 1519 King Henry VIII decided Majesty should become the style of the sovereign of England. "Majesty", however, was not used exclusively; it arbitrarily alternated with both "Highness" and "Grace", even in official documents. For example, one legal judgment issued by Henry VIII uses all three indiscriminately; Article 15 begins with "the Kinges Highness hath ordered," Article 16 with "the Kinges Majestie" and Article 17 with "the Kinges Grace."

In pre-Union Scotland Sovereigns were only addressed as Your Grace.

During the reign of James VI of Scotland and I of England and Ireland, however, James made Majesty the official title, to the exclusion of others.

The style "His/Her Most Excellent Majesty" is used solely for a present or past reigning monarch. The style "Her Most Gracious Majesty" is used for a queen consort, queen mother, or dowager queen.

In 2012, the Speaker of the House of Commons and Lord Speaker used a modified version of this style, addressing Queen Elizabeth II as 'Most Gracious Sovereign'.

See also
Forms of address in the United Kingdom
Style of the British Sovereign
Your Majesty
Your Grace

References

Style of the British sovereign
Superlatives